Casual Company, Casual Detachment, or Casual Platoon, sometimes shortened to simply Casual or abbreviated as CasCo, is a type of unit in the United States military. It is sometimes a holding unit for military personal awaiting assignment to a permanent unit, such as after completing basic training or as combat replacements. It could also be a group awaiting transportation to or from another duty station or for discharge from the military. It also may be an ad hoc unit formed for a specific assignment or duty, such as guarding prisoners. It also can be a unit composed of service members on convalescent duty.

References

Military terminology of the United States
Military units and formations of the United States